Tornbergssjön is a lake of Södermanland, Sweden. The lake inherits its name from the nearby peak Tornberget, which at 111 meters above sea level is the highest point in Stockholm County.

Lakes of Stockholm County